"Tell Me Why" is a single by English singer Declan Galbraith and 83,637 other children.

Released on 9 December 2002, 10 days before his 11th birthday, this was Galbraith's first single.  The single reached number 29 on the UK Singles Chart.

Track listing
 "Tell Me Why (radio edit) featuring the Young Voices"
 "I'll Be There"
 "The New Year Song 2003"
 "Tell Me Why Video"

World record
On 9 December 2002, the largest choir in history, of 83,637, drawn from all parts of the UK and Ireland, joined Declan to sing "Tell Me Why" for a world record, certified by Guinness.  The event was organized by 'Young Voices in Concert'.  Funds from the record-breaking attempt were donated to the Sargent Cancer Care for Children.

References

2002 singles
Songs written by Barry Mason
2002 songs